United Nations Security Council Resolution 1720, adopted unanimously on October 31, 2006, after recalling all previous resolutions on the situation in Western Sahara, including resolutions 1495 (2003), 1541 (2004) and 1675 (2006), the Council extended the mandate of the United Nations Mission for the Referendum in Western Sahara (MINURSO) for six months until April 30, 2007.

Of the fifteen members of the Security Council, 14 approved a draft resolution that included a provision expressing concern about Moroccan human rights abuses in the occupied territory; only France objected, and thus the paragraph was omitted from the final text. The United States had suggested wrapping up the mission during discussions prior to the adoption of Resolution 1720.

Resolution

Observations
The Security Council reaffirmed the need for a durable and mutual solution to the Western Sahara problem, which would provide for the self-determination of the people of the territory.  Both Morocco, the Polisario Front and regional states were urged to co-operate with the United Nations to end the political impasse and reach a solution to the long-running dispute.

Acts
All parties were called upon to respect military agreements reached with MINURSO regarding a ceasefire. Member States were called upon to consider contributing towards confidence-building measures to facilitate greater person-to-person contact, such as family visits. The mandate of MINURSO was extended and the Secretary-General Kofi Annan instructed to report on the situation in Western Sahara. Furthermore, he was also instructed to ensure greater compliance with the zero-tolerance sexual exploitation policy among MINURSO personnel.

See also
 Free Zone (region)
 Legal status of Western Sahara
 List of United Nations Security Council Resolutions 1701 to 1800 (2006–2008)
 Moroccan Wall
 Sahrawi Arab Democratic Republic

References

External links
 
Text of the Resolution at undocs.org

 1720
 1720
 1720
2006 in Western Sahara
2006 in Morocco
October 2006 events